At the 2000 Summer Olympics, women's skeet shooting was included for the first time. The competition was held on 21 September, with Zemfira Meftahatdinova becoming the inaugural champion. The only woman to previously win a skeet competition at the Olympics, Zhang Shan (who won the 1992 competition open to both men and women) participated but did not reach the final.

Records
Prior to this competition, the existing World and Olympic records were as follows.

Qualification round

OR Olympic record – Q Qualified for final

Final

OR Olympic record

References

Sources

Shooting at the 2000 Summer Olympics
Olymp
Women's events at the 2000 Summer Olympics